Sonosuke Fujimaki (born 10 January 1939) is a Japanese épée and sabre fencer. He competed in four events at the 1960 Summer Olympics.

References

External links
 

1939 births
Living people
Japanese male épée fencers
Olympic fencers of Japan
Fencers at the 1960 Summer Olympics
Sportspeople from Kanagawa Prefecture
Japanese male sabre fencers